Profile Lake may mean:

Lakes
Profile Lake (Idaho), a glacial lake in Custer County, Idaho
Profile Lake, a lake in Grafton County, New Hampshire